The Sapindaceae are a family of flowering plants in the order Sapindales known as the soapberry family. It contains 138 genera and 1858 accepted species. Examples include horse chestnut, maples, ackee and lychee.

The Sapindaceae occur in temperate to tropical regions, many in laurel forest habitat, throughout the world. Many are laticiferous, i.e. they contain latex, a milky sap, and many contain mildly toxic saponins with soap-like qualities in either the foliage and/or the seeds, or roots. The largest genera are Serjania, Paullinia, Allophylus and Acer.

Description
Plants of this family have a variety of habits, from trees to herbaceous plants to lianas. The leaves of the tropical genera are usually spirally alternate, while those of the temperate maples (Acer), Aesculus, and a few other genera are opposite. They are most often pinnately compound, but are palmately compound in Aesculus, and simply palmate in Acer. The petiole has a swollen base and lacks stipules. Some genera and species have laurel forest foliage due to convergent evolution.

The flowers are small and unisexual, or functionally unisexual, though plants may be either dioecious or monoecious. They are usually found in cymes grouped in panicles. They most often have four or five petals and sepals (petals are absent in Dodonaea). The stamens range from four to 10, usually on a nectar disc between the petals and stamens, their filaments are often hairy. The most frequent number is eight, in two rings of four. The gynoecium contains two or three carpels, sometimes up to six. The usually single style has a lobed stigma. Most often they are pollinated by birds or insects, with a few species pollinated by wind.

Ripe  fruits may be fleshy or dry. They may be nuts, berries, drupes, schizocarps, capsules (Bridgesia), or samaras (Acer). The embryos are bent or coiled, without endosperm in the seed, and frequently with an aril.

Classification

The Sapindaceae are related to the Rutaceae, and both are usually placed in an order Sapindales or Rutales, depending on whether they are kept separate and which name is used for the order. The most basal member appears to be Xanthoceras. Some authors formerly maintained some or all of Hippocastanaceae and Aceraceae, however this resulted in paraphyly. The former Ptaeroxylaceae, now placed in Rutaceae, were sometimes placed in Sapindaceae. The family is divided into four subfamilies, Dodonaeoideae (about 38 genera), Sapindoideae (about 114 genera), Hippocastanoideae (5 genera) and Xanthoceroideae (1 genus). The largest genera are Serjania (about 220 species), Paullinia (about 180 species),  and Allophylus (about 200 species) in the tropical Sapindoideae and Acer (about 110 species) in the temperate Hippocastanoideae.

The largely temperate genera formerly separated in the families Aceraceae (Acer, Dipteronia) and Hippocastanaceae (Aesculus, Billia, Handeliodendron) were included within a more broadly circumscribed Sapindaceae by the Angiosperm Phylogeny Group. Recent research has confirmed the inclusion of these genera in the Sapindaceae.

Notable species

The Sapindaceae include many species of economically valuable tropical fruit, including the lychee, longan, pitomba, guinip/mamoncillo, korlan, rambutan, pulasan, and ackee. Other products include guaraná, soapberries, and maple syrup.

Some species of maple and buckeye are valued for their wood, while several other genera, such as Koelreuteria, Cardiospermum, and Ungnadia, are popular ornamentals. Schleichera trijuga is the source of Indian macassar oil. Saponins extracted from the drupe of Sapindus species are effective surfactants and are used commercially in cosmetics and detergents.

References

External links 
Sapindaceae in BoDD – Botanical Dermatology Database
 USDA Agricultural Research Service: Fruits and seeds of Sapindaceae. Retrieved 16 July 2018.

 
Sapindales families
Saponaceous plants